Mlađan Šilobad (Serbian Cyrillic: Млађан Шилобад; born July 6, 1971) is a Serbian basketball executive and former player. He is currently serving as the general manager of the KK Partizan NIS.

External links
Adriaticbasket.com Player Info
Eurobasket.com Player Info

1971 births
Living people
ABA League players
BC Khimik players
BC Rytas players
KK Beobanka players
KK Crvena zvezda players
KK FMP (1991–2011) players
KK Partizan players
KK Włocławek players
Maccabi Haifa B.C. players
Oyak Renault basketball players
Sportspeople from Sombor
Serbian expatriate basketball people in Cyprus
Serbian expatriate basketball people in Israel
Serbian expatriate basketball people in Finland
Serbian expatriate basketball people in Lithuania
Serbian expatriate basketball people in Poland
Serbian expatriate basketball people in Turkey
Serbian expatriate basketball people in Ukraine
Serbian basketball executives and administrators
Serbian men's basketball players
Yugoslav men's basketball players
Centers (basketball)